Oncideres malleri is a species of beetle in the family Cerambycidae. It was described by S. A. Fragoso in 1970. It is known from Brazil.

References

malleri
Beetles described in 1970